Payehan (also Romanized as Pāyehān; also known as Pihun and Eyhān) is a village in Zohan Rural District, Zohan District, Zirkuh County, South Khorasan Province, Iran. At the 2006 census, its population was 365, in 111 families.

References 

Populated places in Zirkuh County